The West Germanic languages constitute the largest of the three branches of the Germanic family of languages (the others being the North Germanic and the extinct East Germanic languages). The West Germanic branch is classically subdivided into three branches: Ingvaeonic, which includes English and Frisian, Istvaeonic, which includes Dutch and its close relatives, and Irminonic, which includes German and its close relatives and variants.

English is by far the most-spoken West Germanic language, with more than 1 billion speakers worldwide. Within Europe, the three most prevalent West Germanic languages are English, German, and Dutch. Frisian, spoken by about 450,000 people, constitutes a fourth distinct variety of West Germanic. The language family also includes Afrikaans, Yiddish, Low Saxon, Luxembourgish, and Scots, which are closely related to Dutch, German and English respectively. Additionally, several creoles, patois, and pidgins are based on Dutch, English, or German.

History

Origins and characteristics
The Germanic languages are traditionally divided into three groups: West, East and North Germanic. In some cases, their exact relation was difficult to determine from the sparse evidence of runic inscriptions, so that some individual varieties have been difficult to classify. This is especially true for the unattested Jutish language; today, most scholars classify Jutish as a West Germanic variety with several features of North Germanic.

Until the late 20th century, some scholars claimed that all Germanic languages remained mutually intelligible throughout the Migration Period, while others hold that speakers of West Germanic dialects like Old Frankish and speakers of Gothic were already unable to communicate fluently by around the 3rd century AD. As a result of the substantial progress in the study of Proto-West Germanic in the early 21st century, there is a growing consensus that East and West Germanic indeed would have been mutually unintelligible at that time, whereas West and North Germanic remained partially intelligible.

Dialects with the features assigned to the western group formed from Proto-Germanic in the late Jastorf culture (ca. 1st century BC). The West Germanic group is characterized by a number of phonological, morphological and lexical innovations or archaisms not found in North and East Germanic. Examples of West Germanic phonological particularities are:

 The delabialization of all labiovelar consonants except word-initially.
 Change of *-zw- and *- đw- to *-ww- e.g. *izwiz > *iwwiz ‘you’ dat.pl.; *feđwōr > *fewwōr ‘four’. 
This must have occurred after *-zw- and *- đw- have become *-ww-.
 Replacement of the second-person singular preterite ending -t with -ī (indicative and Subjunctive mood). Since more than 150 years there is a scientific debate on the best explanation of these difficult forms. Today, most linguists, beginning with J. v. Fierlinger in 1885 and followed by R. Löwe (1907), O. Behaghel (1922), Jakob Sverdrup (1927), Hermann Hirt (1932), E. Polomé (1964), W. Meid (1971), E. Hill (2004), K.-H. Mottausch and W. Euler (1992ff.) explain(ed) this ending as a relict of the Indo-European aorist tense. Under this assumption, the ending -t would have replaced older -ī(z). Sceptical about this explanation - and mostly explaining these forms as influenced by optative forms - were/are W. Scherer (1868), W. L. van Helten (before 1917), Edward Schröder (1921), Bammesberger (1986) and Don Ringe (2014).
 Loss of word-final . Only Old High German preserves it at all (as ) and only in single-syllable words.
  Loss of final *-a (including from PGmc. *-an#) in polysyllables: e.g. acc. sg. OHG horn vs. ORu. horna ‘horn’; this change must have occurred after the loss of word-final .
 West Germanic gemination: lengthening of all consonants except  before .; this change must have occurred after the loss of final *-a.
 Change of Proto-Germanic *e to i before i and j.

A relative chronology of about 20 sound changes from Proto-Northwest Germanic to Proto-West Germanic (some of them only regional) has been published by Don Ringe in 2014.

A phonological archaism of West Germanic is the preservation of grammatischer Wechsel in most verbs, particularly in Old High German. This implies the same for West Germanic, whereas in East and North Germanic many of these alternations (in Gothic almost all of them) had been levelled out analogically by the time of the earliest texts.

A common morphological innovation of the West Germanic languages is the development of a gerund.

Common morphological archaisms of West Germanic include:
 The preservation of an instrumental case,
 the preservation of the athematic verbs (e.g. Anglo-Saxon dō(m), Old Saxon dōm, OHG. tōm "I do"),
 the preservation of some traces of the aorist (in Old English and Old High German, but neither in Gothic nor in North Germanic).

Furthermore, the West Germanic languages share many lexemes not existing in North Germanic and/or East Germanic – archaisms as well as common neologisms. Some lexems have specific meanings in West Germanic and there are specific innovations in word formation and derivational morphology, for example neologisms ending with modern English -ship (< wgerm. -*skapi, cf. German -schaft) like friendship (< wg. *friund(a)skapi, cf. German Freundschaft) are specific to the West Germanic languages and are thus seen as a Proto West Germanic innovation.

Existence of West Germanic proto-language 
Since at least the early 20th century, a number of morphological, phonological, and lexical archaisms and innovations have been identified as specifically West Germanic. Since then, individual Proto-West Germanic lexemes have also been reconstructed. Yet, there was a long dispute if these West Germanic characteristics had to be explained with the existence of a West Germanic proto-language or rather with Sprachbund effects. Hans Frede Nielsen's 1981 study Old English and the Continental Germanic Languages made the conviction grow that a West Germanic proto-language did exist. But up until the 1990s, some scholars doubted that there was once a Proto-West-Germanic proto-language which was ancestral only to later West Germanic languages. In 2002, Gert Klingenschmitt presented a series of pioneering reconstructions of Proto-West Germanic morphological paradigmas and new views on some early West Germanic phonological changes, and in 2013 the first monographic analysis and description of Proto-West Germanic was published (second edition 2022).

Today, there is a scientific consensus on what Don Ringe stated in 2012, that "these [phonological and morphological] changes amount to a massive evidence for a valid West Germanic clade".

After East Germanic broke off (an event usually dated to the 2nd or 1st century BC), the remaining Germanic languages, the Northwest Germanic languages, divided into four main dialects: North Germanic, and the three groups conventionally called "West Germanic", namely
 North Sea Germanic, ancestral to Anglo-Frisian and Old Saxon
 Weser-Rhine Germanic, ancestral to Old Dutch and present as a substrate or superstrate in some of the Central Franconian and Rhine Franconian dialects of Old High German
 Elbe Germanic, ancestral to the Upper German and most Central German dialects of Old High German, and the extinct Langobardic language.

Although there is quite a bit of knowledge about North Sea Germanic or Anglo-Frisian (because of the characteristic features of its daughter languages, Anglo-Saxon/Old English and Old Frisian), linguists know almost nothing about "Weser-Rhine Germanic" and "Elbe Germanic". In fact, both terms were coined in the 1940s to refer to groups of archaeological findings, rather than linguistic features. Only later were the terms applied to hypothetical dialectal differences within both regions. Even today, the very small number of Migration Period runic inscriptions from the area, many of them illegible, unclear or consisting only of one word, often a name, is insufficient to identify linguistic features specific to the two supposed dialect groups.

Evidence that East Germanic split off before the split between North and West Germanic comes from a number of linguistic innovations common to North and West Germanic, including:
 The lowering of Proto-Germanic ē (also written ǣ) to ā.
 The development of umlaut.
 The development of the demonstrative pronoun ancestral to English this.

Under that view, the properties that the West Germanic languages have in common separate from the North Germanic languages are not necessarily inherited from a "Proto-West-Germanic" language but may have spread by language contact among the Germanic languages spoken in Central Europe, not reaching those spoken in Scandinavia or reaching them much later. Rhotacism, for example, was largely complete in West Germanic while North Germanic runic inscriptions still clearly distinguished the two phonemes. There is also evidence that the lowering of ē to ā occurred first in West Germanic and spread to North Germanic later since word-final ē was lowered before it was shortened in West Germanic, but in North Germanic the shortening occurred first, resulting in e that later merged with i. However, there are also a number of common archaisms in West Germanic shared by neither Old Norse nor Gothic. Some authors who support the concept of a West Germanic proto-language claim that, not only shared innovations can require the existence of a linguistic clade, but also that there are archaisms that cannot be explained simply as retentions later lost in the North or East, because this assumption can produce contradictions with attested features of the other branches.

The debate on the existence of a Proto-West-Germanic clade was recently (2006) summarized:
That North Germanic is... a unitary subgroup [of Proto-Germanic] is completely obvious, as all of its dialects shared a long series of innovations, some of them very striking. That the same is true of West Germanic has been denied, but I will argue in vol. ii that all the West Germanic languages share several highly unusual innovations that virtually force us to posit a West Germanic clade. On the other hand, the internal subgrouping of both North Germanic and West Germanic is very messy, and it seems clear that each of those subfamilies diversified into a network of dialects that remained in contact for a considerable period of time (in some cases right up to the present).

The reconstruction of Proto-West-Germanic
Several scholars have published reconstructions of Proto-West-Germanic morphological paradigms and many authors have reconstructed individual Proto-West-Germanic morphological forms or lexemes. The first comprehensive reconstruction of the Proto-West-Germanic language was published in 2013 by Wolfram Euler, followed in 2014 by the study of Donald Ringe and Ann Taylor.

Dating Early West Germanic

If indeed Proto-West-Germanic existed, it must have been between the 2nd and 7th centuries. Until the late 2nd century AD, the language of runic inscriptions found in Scandinavia and in Northern Germany were so similar that Proto-North-Germanic and the Western dialects in the south were still part of one language ("Proto-Northwest-Germanic"). After that, the split into West and North Germanic occurred. By the 4th and 5th centuries the great migration set in. By the end of the 6th century, the area in which West Germanic languages were spoken, at least by the upper classes, had tripled compared to the year 400. This caused an increasing disintegration of the West Germanic language and finally the formation of the daughter languages.

It has been argued that, judging by their nearly identical syntax, the West Germanic dialects were closely enough related to have been mutually intelligible up to the 7th century. Over the course of this period, the dialects diverged successively. The High German consonant shift that occurred mostly during the 7th century AD in what is now southern Germany, Austria, and Switzerland can be considered the end of the linguistic unity among the West Germanic dialects, although its effects on their own should not be overestimated. Bordering dialects very probably continued to be mutually intelligible even beyond the boundaries of the consonant shift.

Middle Ages

During the Early Middle Ages, the West Germanic languages were separated by the insular development of Old and Middle English on one hand, and by the High German consonant shift on the continent on the other.

The High German consonant shift distinguished the High German languages from the other West Germanic languages. By early modern times, the span had extended into considerable differences, ranging from Highest Alemannic in the South (the Walliser dialect being the southernmost surviving German dialect) to Northern Low Saxon in the North. Although both extremes are considered German, they are not mutually intelligible. The southernmost varieties have completed the second sound shift, whereas the northern dialects remained unaffected by the consonant shift.

Of modern German varieties, Low German is the one that most resembles modern English. The district of Angeln (or Anglia), from which the name English derives, is in the extreme northern part of Germany between the Danish border and the Baltic coast. The area of the Saxons (parts of today's Schleswig-Holstein and Lower Saxony) lay south of Anglia. The Angles and Saxons, two Germanic tribes, in combination with a number of other peoples from northern Germany and the Jutland Peninsula, particularly the Jutes, settled in Britain following the end of Roman rule in the island. Once in Britain, these Germanic peoples eventually developed a shared cultural and linguistic identity as Anglo-Saxons; the extent of the linguistic influence of the native Romano-British population on the incomers is debatable.

Family tree 

Note that divisions between subfamilies of continental Germanic languages are rarely precisely defined; most form dialect continua, with adjacent dialects being mutually intelligible and more separated ones not.
 North Sea Germanic / Ingvaeonic languages
 Anglo-Frisian languages
 English Languages/Anglic
 English
 Scots
 Yola 
 Fingalian (extinct)
 Frisian languages
 West Frisian
 East Frisian
 Saterland Frisian
 North Frisian
 Low German / Low Saxon
 Northern Low Saxon
 Westphalian
 Eastphalian
 Brandenburg dialects
 Central Pomeranian (moribund)
 East Pomeranian (moribund)
 Low Prussian (moribund)
 Dutch Low Saxon
 Weser-Rhine Germanic / Istvaeonic languages / Netherlandic / Low Frankish
 Dutch
 Afrikaans
 West Flemish
 East Flemish
 Zeelandic
 Central Dutch
 Hollandic
 Zuid-Gelders
 Brabantine
 Clevian/Meuse-Rhenish
 Limburgian
 Elbe Germanic / Irminonic languages / High German
 German
 Central German
 Rhine Franconian, including the dialects of Hessen, Pennsylvania German, and most of those from Lorraine
 Ripuarian
 Thuringian
 Upper Saxon German
 High German
 Alemannic, including Swiss German and Alsatian
 Swabian
 Bavarian
 East Franconian
 South Franconian
 Silesian (moribund)
 High Prussian (moribund)
 Lombardic  Langobardic (extinct, unless Cimbrian and Mocheno are in fact Langobardic remnants.)
 Luxembourgish
 Pennsylvania Dutch language
 Yiddish (a language based on Eastern-Central dialects of late Middle High German/Early New High German)

Comparison of phonological and morphological features

The following table shows a list of various linguistic features and their extent among the West Germanic languages, organized roughly from northwest to southeast. Some may only appear in the older languages but are no longer apparent in the modern languages.

The following table shows some comparisons of consonant development in the respective dialect/language (online examples though) continuum, showing the gradually growing partake in the High German consonant shift and the anglofrisian palatalization. The table uses IPA, to avoid confusion via orthographical differences. The realisation of [r] will be ignored.

C = any consonant, A = back vowel, E = front vowel

Phonology 

The existence of a unified Proto-West-Germanic language is debated, features which are common to West Germanic languages may be attributed either to common inheritance or to areal effects.

The phonological system of the West Germanic branching as reconstructed is mostly similar to that of Proto-Germanic, with some changes in the categorization and phonetic realization of some phonemes.

Consonants 
In addition to the particular changes described above, some notable differences in the consonant system of West Germanic from Proto-Germanic are:

 Fortition of /ð/ to /d/ in all positions
 The transition of /z/ into a rhotic consonant (often transcribed as ʀ), which eventually merged with /r/
 A process referred to as West Germanic gemination, which is visible in the history of all West Germanic languages

Vowels 
Some notable differences in the vowel system of West Germanic from Proto-Germanic are:

 Reduction of overlong vowels to simple long vowels
 Lowering of /ɛː/ to /æ:/
 The creation of a new short /o/ phoneme, from the lowering of /u/ in initial syllables before /a/, and the reduction of word-final /ɔː/

Morphology

Nouns

The noun paradigms of Proto-West Germanic have been reconstructed as follows:

West Germanic vocabulary
The following table compares a number of Frisian, English, Scotch, Yola, Dutch, Limburgish, German and Afrikaans words with common West Germanic (or older) origin. The grammatical gender of each term is noted as masculine (m.), feminine (f.), or neuter (n.) where relevant.

Other words, with a variety of origins:

Note that some of the shown similarities of Frisian and English vis-à-vis Dutch and German are secondary and not due to a closer relationship between them. For example, the plural of the word for "sheep" was originally unchanged in all four languages and still is in some Dutch dialects and a great deal of German dialects. Many other similarities, however, are indeed old inheritances.

Notes

References

Bibliography
 Adamus, Marian (1962). On the mutual relations between Nordic and other Germanic dialects. Germanica Wratislavensia 7. 115–158.
 Bammesberger, Alfred (1984). Der indogermanische Aorist und das germanische Präteritum [The Indo-European aorist and the Germanic past tense], in: Languages and Cultures. Studies in Honor of Edgar C. Polomé. 791 pp., Berlin: de Gruyter.
 Bammesberger, Alfred (Ed.) (1991). Old English Runes and their Continental Background. Heidelberg: Winter.
 Bammesberger, Alfred (1996). The Preterite of Germanic Strong Verbs in Classes Fore and Five, in "North-Western European Language Evolution" 27, 33–43.
 Behaghel, Otto (1922). Die 2. Pers. Sing. Ind. Prät. st. Flexion im Westgermanischen. IF (Indogermanische Forschungen), vol. 40, p. 167f.
 Bremmer, Rolf H. (ed.) (1993). Current trends in West Germanic etymological lexicography: proceedings of the Symposium held in Amsterdam 12 - 13 June 1989. Leiden: Brill.
 Bremmer, Rolf H., Jr. (2009). An Introduction to Old Frisian. History, Grammar, Reader, Glossary. Amsterdam / Philadelphia: Benjamins Publishing Company.
 Euler, Wolfram (2002/03). Vom Westgermanischen zum Althochdeutschen (From West Germanic to Old High German), Sprachaufgliederung im Dialektkontinuum, in Klagenfurter Beiträge zur Sprachwissenschaft, Vol. 28/29, 69–90.
 Euler, Wolfram (2013). Das Westgermanische – von der Herausbildung im 3. bis zur Aufgliederung im 7. Jahrhundert – Analyse und Rekonstruktion. 244 p., in German with English summary, Verlag Inspiration Un Limited, London/Berlin 2013, .
 Euler, Wolfram (2022). Das Westgermanische – von der Herausbildung im 3. bis zur Aufgliederung im 7. Jahrhundert – Analyse und Rekonstruktion (West Germanic: from its Emergence in the 3rd up until its Dissolution in the 7th Century CE: Analyses and Reconstruction). 267 p., in German with English summary, 2nd edition, Verlag Inspiration Unlimited, Berlin 2022, .
 v. Fierlinger, J. (1885). Zur deutschen Conjugation (Präsentia der Wurzelclasse. Zur westgerm. Flexion des verb. subst.), in Kuhns Zeitschrift (KZ), vol. 27, p. 432ff. 
 Härke, Heinrich (2011). Anglo-Saxon Immigration and Ethnogenesis, in: „Medieval Archaeology” No. 55, 2011, pp. 1–28.
 Hill, Eugen (2004). Das germanische Verb für 'tun' und die Ausgänge des germanischen schwachen Präteritums, in: Sprachwissenschaft, ISSN 0344-8169, Vol. 29, no. 3, p. 257-304.
 Hilsberg, Susan (2009). Place-Names and Settlement History. Aspects of Selected Topographical Elements on the Continent and in England, Magister Theses, Universität Leipzig.
 Hirt, Hermann (1931, 1932, 1934). Handbuch des Urgermanischen [Handbook of Proto-Germanic] (3 vols.). Heidelberg: Winter.
 Klein, Thomas (2004). Im Vorfeld des Althochdeutschen und Altsächsischen (Prior to Old High German and Old Saxon), in Entstehung des Deutschen. Heidelberg, 241–270.
 Klingenschmitt, Gert (2002). Zweck und Methode der sprachlichen Rekonstruktion, in: Peter Anreiter (et al.) Name, Sprache, und Kulturen. Festschrift Heinz Dieter Pohl. Wien, 453-474. 
 Kortlandt, Frederik (2008). Anglo-Frisian, in „North-Western European Language Evolution“ 54/55, 265 – 278.
 Looijenga, Jantina Helena (1997). Runes around the North Sea and on the Continent AD 150–700; Text & Contents. Groningen: SSG Uitgeverij.
 Friedrich Maurer (1942), Nordgermanen und Alemannen:  Studien zur germanischen und frühdeutschen Sprachgeschichte, Stammes- und Volkskunde, Strassburg: Hüneburg.
 Mees, Bernard (2002). The Bergakker inscription and the beginnings of Dutch, in „Amsterdamer Beiträge zur älteren Germanistik” 56, 23–26.
 Meid, Wolfgang (1971). Das germanische Praeteritum. Indogermanische Grundlagen und Entfaltung im Germanischen [The Germanic Praeteritum. Indo-European foundations and development in Germanic] 134pp,. Innsbrucker Beiträge zur Sprachwissenschaft; 3. University, Innsbruck.
 Mottausch, Karl-Heinz (1998). Die reduplizierenden Verben im Nord- und Westgermanischen: Versuch eines Raum-Zeit-Modells, in "North-Western European Language Evolution" 33, 43–91.
 Mottausch, Karl-Heinz (2011). Der Nominalakzent im Frühurgermanischen - Hamburg: Kovač.
 Mottausch, Karl-Heinz (2013). Untersuchungen zur Vorgeschichte des germanischen starken Verbs. Die Rolle des Aorists, 278p. - Hamburg: Kovač.
 Nielsen, Hans F. (1981). Old English and the Continental Germanic languages. A Survey of Morphological and Phonological Interrelations. Innsbruck: Institut für Sprachwissenschaft. (2nd edition 1985), 311p., Innsbruck:  Institut für Sprachwissenschaft. 
 Nielsen, Hans Frede. (2000). Ingwäonisch. In Heinrich Beck et al. (eds.), Reallexikon der Germanischen Altertumskunde (2. Auflage), Band 15, 432–439. Berlin: De Gruyter.
 Page, Raymond I. (1999). An Introduction to English Runes, 2. edition. Woodbridge: Bogdell Press.
 Page, Raymond I. (2001). Frisian Runic Inscriptions, in Horst Munske et al., "Handbuch des Friesischen". Tübingen, 523–530.
 Polomé, Edgar C. (1964). Diachronic development of structural patterns in the Germanic conjugation system, pp. 870-880, in: Lunt, Horace G. (ed.) (1964). Proceedings of the Ninth International Congress of Linguists. The Hague.
 Ringe, Donald R. (2012). Cladistic principles and linguistic reality: the case of West Germanic. In Philomen Probert and Andreas Willi (eds.), Laws and Rules on Indo-European, 33–42. Oxford.
 Ringe, Donald R. (2012): Cladistic Methodology and West Germanic. Yale Linguistics.
 Ringe, Donald R. and Taylor, Ann (2014). The Development of Old English – A Linguistic History of English, vol. II, 632p. . Oxford.
 Robinson, Orrin W. (1992). Old English and Its Closest Relatives. A Survey of the Earliest Germanic Languages. Stanford University Press.
 Seebold, Elmar (1998). "Die Sprache(n) der Germanen in der Zeit der Völkerwanderung" (The Language(s) of the Germanic Peoples during the Migration Period), in E. Koller & H. Laitenberger, Suevos – Schwaben. Das Königreich der Sueben auf der Iberischen Halbinsel (411–585). Tübingen, 11–20.
 Seebold, Elmar (2006). "Westgermanische Sprachen" (West Germanic Languages), in Reallexikon der germanischen Altertumskunde 33, 530–536.
 Stifter, David (2009). "The Proto-Germanic shift *ā > ō and early Germanic linguistic contacts", in Historische Sprachforschung 122, 268–283.
 Stiles, Patrick V. (1985-1986). The fate of the numeral “4” in Germanic. Nowele 6 pp. 81–104, 7 pp. 3–27, 8 pp. 3–25. 
 Stiles, Patrick V. (1995). Remarks on the “Anglo-Frisian” thesis, in „Friesische Studien I”. Odense, 177–220.
 Stiles, Patrick V. (2004). Place-adverbs and the development of Proto-Germanic long *ē1 in early West Germanic. In Irma Hyvärinen et al. (Hg.), Etymologie, Entlehnungen und Entwicklungen. Mémoires de la Soc. Néophil. de Helsinki 63. Helsinki. 385–396.
 Stiles, Patrick V. (2013). The Pan-West Germanic Isoglosses and the Subrelationships of West Germanic to Other Branches. In Unity and Diversity in West Germanic, I. Special issue of NOWELE 66:1 (2013), Nielsen, Hans Frede and Patrick V. Stiles (eds.), 5 ff.
 Voyles, Joseph B. (1974). West Germanic inflection, derivation and compounding, 240p., The Hague: Mouton.
 Voyles, Joseph B. (1992). Early Germanic Grammar: pre-, proto-, and post-Germanic Language. San Diego: Academic Press

External links

 

 
Germanic languages